Listapad (meaning "November"), also known as Minsk International Film Festival (MIFF) or Minsk International Film Festival Listapad, is an annual film festival which takes place in November in Minsk, Belarus. It is the largest such festival in Belarus.

History
The inaugural festival was held in 1994, at a time when Belarus had just gained independence and had fallen out of the world and post-Soviet film industry.

Serhey Artimovich, the director of Tele-ARS studio, came up with the idea for the festival. Listapad was created in order to unite the best films of post-Soviet states and bring them back on the screen in Minsk. The participating films had already passed through the more radical film festivals of Kinotavr and Kinoshock.

During the first year of existence, the festival was called "Post-Soviet Film Festival "Listapad". Russian directors made the majority of films presented there. Later works of Ukrainian, Kazakh and Azerbaijani directors joined the program of the festival. 
Rating system was established since the first year. Viewers give their rate to the film in special forms, which are spread before the screening.

Rostislav Yankovsky became the Chairman of the Festival in 1994 (currently holding a position of Honorary Chairman of the Festival).

Between 1996 and 2008 Valentina Stepanova was directing the Festival. During this period, representatives of 45 countries have joined the Festival as directors, producers, jury and press. New nominations were introduced and special prizes from media and guilds were established as well as prizes for Best Actress and Best Actor.

The Children and Youth Films Competition "Listapadzik" became the main novelty of the festival in 2008.
In 2003, the Festival was officially recognized as an International. Films from Poland, Russia, Serbia, Bulgaria, Czech Republic, USA, Iran, China and Japan were screened at the Festival during this year.

2007 was also special for the festival. Valentina Stepanova and film critic and editor Irina Demyanova have organized the first Documentary Films Competition. Since then Irina Demyanova holds the position of Documentary Film program director of the Festival.

In 2010, Anzhela Krashevskaya became the director of the Festival. Igor Sukmanov has been Feature Film program director since this year. 2010 was also a year for renovation of the Festival. New format of The Festival included Main Feature Film Competition (at least 12 films participating), Feature Films Competition "Youth on the March" (9 film debuts from the directors from all around the globe), Main Documentary Film Competition (20 films participating) and National Schools Documentary Competition (for works of young directors, representing the particular film school) (12 films).

Description
MIFF Listapad is Belarus' largest film festival. It takes place over a week in November each year, and comprises three sections: feature films, documentaries, and the children and youth film festival, Listapadzik.
The top prize of the Festival is called "Golden "Listapad".  Other two are "Silver Listapad" and "Listapad Bronze Audience Award". International Jury and International Film Critics Jury award them to the competing works.

The International Federation of Film Producers Associations (FIAPF) accredits the festival as a competitive specialised film festival of Baltic countries, as well as countries of Central Asia, Central and Eastern Europe.
The festival also provides an educational platform for communication between cinema professionals. Varied workshops, discussions and exhibitions are held to provide an opportunity to learn from masters of cinema and to discuss significant problems related to the development of cinematography.

Special guests of the festival have included Alyona Babenko, Juozas Budraitis, Lyudmila Gurchenko, Krzysztof Zanussi, Claire Denis, Andrey Zvyagintsev, Emir Kusturica, Sergei Loznitsa, Brillante Mendoza, Kira Muratova, Ornella Muti and Alexander Sokurov.

Competition
The festival includes following competitions:
 Main Feature Film Competition;
 Feature Film Competition "Youth on March";
 National Competition;
 Main Documentary Film Competition;
 1st-2nd Documentary Film Competition – National Film School Competition;
 Children and Youth Films Competition "Listapadzik".

Films should be no older than two years to be allowed to participate in the Competition. No fewer than 12 films that have never been screened in Belarus and produced in the Post-Soviet states and former Eastern Bloc countries participate in the Main Feature Films Competition.

"Youth on the March" Competition supports young directors. No less than 8 films produced by young professionals participate in the Competition. Participating films can be either debut or second work in the director's filmography.

Representatives of no less than 6 film schools from all over the world (each one of them presents 3-4 most outstanding student works including diploma works) participate in 1st - 2nd Documentary Films Competition –National Film Schools Competition.

Full-length feature films and animation films that have been specially mentioned and highly acclaimed at international festivals participate in the Children and Youth Films Competition "Listapadzik".

National Competition is the novation of the Festival in 2014. Fiction, documentary and animated full-length and short films created by Belarusian authors in Belarus and abroad during the last two years can participate in the National Competition. International Jury will judge this Competition.

Traditional format of the Festival includes not only viewers' voting, but also discussions between authors and viewers. In 2013 Claire Denis (retrospective), Kira Muratova (Eternal Homecoming), Brillante Mendoza ("Captive" and "Thy Womb") and Alexander Veledinsky ("The Geographer Drank His Globe Away") have presented and discussed their works in Minsk.

Jury

To judge the films in the Competition Programmes six juries are set up: International Jury of the Main Feature Films Competition (5 people), International Jury of the Feature Films Competition "Youth on the March" (3 people), International Jury of the National Competition (3 people), International Jury of the Main Documentary Films Competition (5 people), International Jury of the 1st - 2nd Documentary Films Competition – National Film Schools Competition (3 people). International Film Critics Jury (7 people) judge all the feature and documentary films competitions of the Festival. International Jury of 3 people judges Children and Youth Films Competition "Listapadzik".

Awards

Feature Film Competition

Prizes for Main Feature Film Competition:
 The Grand-Prix "Golden Listapad" for best film;
 Award for Best Director;
 Yury Marukhin Memorial Award for Best Cinematography;
 Special Jury Award (awarded in accordance with the Jury's decision)

The International Jury of Feature Films Competition "Youth on the March" gives "Victor Turov Memorial Award for Best Film in "Youth on the March" Feature Films Competition".

Documentary Film Competition

The International Jury of the Main Documentary Films Competition gives the following awards:
 Grand-Prix for Best Documentary Film;
 Special Jury Award (awarded in accordance with the Jury's decision).

The International Jury of the 1st -2nd Documentary Films Competition gives the "Award for Best 1st - 2nd Documentary Film".

The Children and Youth Films Competition "Listapadzik"

The International Jury of Children and Youth Films Competition "Listapadzik" gives the following awards:

 Award for Best Film for Children;
 Award for Best Film for Youth;
 Award for Best Young Actor or Actress;
 Award for Best Adult Actor in Children's film.

The Main award of the Competition "Golden Listapadzik" is given after the results of audience vote.

The International Film Critics Jury gives the following awards 

 Listapad Silver Award for Art as Phenomenon;
 Award for Best Actress in a Leading Role;
 Award for Best Actor in a Leading Role;
 Award for Best Actress in a Supporting Role;
 Award for Best Actor in a Supporting Role.

All judges have a right to award special prizes for the main film professions. 
Listapad Bronze Audience Award for best feature film is given according to the results of preference vote. The audience may vote for all the feature film programs (except Retrospective Screenings). 
The Prize "For Humanism and Spirituality in the Cinema" awarded to the author of a film in competition which contains spiritual, humanistic and moral problematic (instituted by Alexander Lukashenko, the President of the Republic of Belarus). In 2013 Lithuanian actor Juozas Budraitis was awarded with this prize.

Numbers of XX Festival "Listapad-2013"

 145 Feature, Documentary and animation Films from 50 countries were screened;
 More than 27 000 people attended Festival's film screenings;
 125 famous guests;
 Dozens of places (including 7 cinemas) restaurants, galleries, hotels became hosting platforms for the festival;
 12 workshops took place as a part of educational program;
 110 accredited journalists;
 150 volunteers involved to make the Festival happen;
 "Listapad-2013" lasted 172 hours.

References

External links

Entertainment events in Belarus
Annual events in Belarus
Film festivals in Belarus
Autumn events in Belarus